Osman Abdulvagabovich Nurmagomedov (born 21 May 1998) is a Russian-born Azerbaijani freestyle wrestler of Avar descent who currently competes at 92 kilograms. Nurmagomedov has medaled at the 2021 European Championships as well as the U23 edition also in 2021.

Achievements

References

External links 
 

Living people
1998 births
Place of birth missing (living people)
Azerbaijani male sport wrestlers
European Wrestling Championships medalists
World Wrestling Championships medalists
Sportspeople from Makhachkala
20th-century Azerbaijani people
21st-century Azerbaijani people